This is a list of Dutch television related events from 1960.

Events
9 February - Rudi Carrell is selected to represent Netherlands at the 1960 Eurovision Song Contest with his song "Wat een geluk". He is selected to be the fifth Dutch Eurovision entry during Nationaal Songfestival held at AVRO Studios in Hilversum.

Debuts

Television shows

1950s
NOS Journaal (1956–present)
Pipo de Clown (1958-1980)

Ending this year

Births
29 April - Gerard Joling, singer & TV presenter
2 May - Hans Schiffers, TV & radio presenter

Deaths